Walnut Grove is an unincorporated community in Jackson Township, Pope County, Arkansas, United States. It is located on Walnut Grove Road, east of Hector.

References

Unincorporated communities in Pope County, Arkansas
Unincorporated communities in Arkansas